In a Strange Room is a 2010 novel by South African writer Damon Galgut. It was shortlisted for the Man Booker Prize in 2010, as well as for the Ondaatje Prize.

Plot synopsis
The novel is divided into three sections, namely "The Follower", "The Lover" and "The Guardian". It concerns Damon, a South African writer who is infected by wanderlust as he goes backpacking abroad and meet different people. In "The Follower", Damon meets a German backpacker named Reiner in Greece, and becomes his travelling companion.  Subsequently, in "The Lover", he follows a Frenchman and two Swiss fraternal twins—a man and a woman—travelling through Africa. In both Damon is aware of a homoerotic feeling which binds him to Reiner and Jerome, one of the twins. The final section takes place in India, where he is minding a female friend Anna with severe psychiatric illness and who is threatening suicide.

2010 novels
21st-century South African novels
Novels by Damon Galgut
Atlantic Books books